Soroti District is a district in Eastern Uganda. It is named after its chief municipal, administrative and commercial headquarters, Soroti, where the district headquarters are located.

Location
Soroti District is bordered by Amuria District to the north, Katakwi District to the east, Ngora District to the southeast, Serere District to the south, and Kaberamaido District to the west.

Overview
Soroti District is part of Teso sub-region, which includes the following districts:

Amuria District
Bukedea District
Kaberamaido District
Katakwi District
Kumi District
Ngora District
Serere District
Soroti District

The sub-region is home to an estimated 2.5 million people of Iteso and Kumam ethnicities.

Population
The national census of 1991 estimated the district population at about 113,900. Eleven years later, the 2002 national census put the  district population at approximately 193,300 of whom 51.2% were female and 48.8% were male. In 2011, the Uganda Bureau of Statistics estimated the District population at about 322,000.

The district has one of the highest levels of poverty in the country. In February 2009, it was estimated that 53 percent of the population in the district (an estimated 124,300 people) live on less than US$1.00 per day. The two predominant ethnicities in the district are the Iteso and the Kumam. The main languages spoken in the district are Ateso, Kumam, and Swahili.

Economic activity 
Agriculture is the main economic activity in the district. Crops grown include: The produce is consumed locally and some is sold in the urban areas, particularly in Soroti Town.

See also
Soroti
Teso sub-region
Districts of Uganda

References

External links
 Soroti District Portal
About Soroti District

 
Teso sub-region
Districts of Uganda
Eastern Region, Uganda